Starworks Motorsport is an American automobile racing team based in Ft. Lauderdale, Florida, currently competing in the new for 2014 TUDOR United SportsCar Championship. The team was established in 2010 by Peter Baron and runs a Riley Daytona Prototype and two Prototype Challenge Oreca Chevrolet FLM09 cars.

History

Peter Baron is a successful entrepreneur, and former Le Mans 24 Hours class podium finisher, with 20 years of motorsports experience as a driver, manager and winning team owner. He has run successful motor racing teams since 2005 in the Indy Car Series, GRAND AM, and Indy Racing League Indy Car Series. He re-launched his team in January 2010 as Starworks Motorsport and competed in the entire Rolex Sports Car Series with one, and sometimes two, Riley-BMW Daytona Prototypes. In 2011, the Starworks switched to Ford power and fielded an additional Riley Daytona Prototype in select races, capped off by an end-of-season victory at Mid-Ohio Sports Car Course with drivers Ryan Dalziel and Enzo Potolicchio.

In 2012, Starworks kicked off the year with pole at the 2012 24 Hours of Daytona by Ryan Dalziel en route to a second-place finish in the race with drivers Ryan Dalziel, Allan McNish, Lucas Luhr, Enzo Potolicchio and Alex Popow. The team started from pole position, led the most laps and had the fastest race lap.

The team also debuted in the Continental Tire Sports Car Challenge with four Ford Mustang Boss 302R GTs.

On February 2, 2012, Starworks announced that it would compete in the FIA World Endurance Championship, becoming only the second American team to do so. At the 2012 12 Hours of Sebring, Dalziel, Potolicchio and Stéphane Sarrazin managed to finish 1st in LMP2 ahead of Level 5 Motorsports and 3rd overall. This was their 2nd overall podium of the year after Daytona. At the 2012 24 Hours of Le Mans Starworks finished 1st in LMP2 and 7th overall.

These milestones concluded an incredible season for Starworks with victories at the 12 Hours of Sebring, 24 Hours of Le Mans, the first Rolex Series race at Indianapolis Motor Speedway, plus a second-place finish in the ‘Rolex 24 At Daytona’ and third in the Sahlen’s Six Hours of The Glen. By doing so the team entered the history books by becoming the first LMP2 Champions in the WEC and the first North American team to win an FIA World Championship in 46 years. The team also won the 2012 GRAND-AM North American Endurance Championship and led with the most laps in a Daytona Prototype.

Peter Baron has since been honoured by the Greater Pompano Beach Chamber of Commerce at a luncheon held at the Hillsboro Beach Club. He joined nine other area residents recognized for their accomplishments and achievements which have reflected positively on the community — a “Shining Light of the Community.” Peter also became the recipient of the 2012 Rolex Bob Snodgrass Award of Excellence. The announcement was made during the traditional prelude to the 2013 Rolex 24 at Daytona - the Grand Marshal Dinner — which was held at the Daytona 500 Club and attended by 300 guests on January 25, 2013. From a short-list of three highly successful team owners who competed in the 2012 Grand-Am Rolex Sports Car Series, a panel of motorsports professionals selected Baron as the award recipient.

Stewart Wicht, President of Rolex Watch U.S.A., presented Baron with a specially-engraved Rolex Stainless Steel and Platinum Yacht-Master timepiece to commemorate the honor. “This award goes to a team owner or manager in the Grand-Am series who best represents the qualities my father was known for: that is integrity, his passion for motorsports and his immense love for cars,” said Harris Snodgrass, son of the award's namesake.

In 2013 Alex Popow won the ‘Jim Trueman’ Award by a landslide and the team was crowned ‘Sports Car Team of the Year’ by the SPEED Channel.

Starworks Motorsport came fourth in the 2013 GRAND-AM Rolex Sports Car Series (DP Class) and also competed in two ALMS races (one as RSR Racing) in the LMPC category.

Past and current drivers include
Renger van der Zande
Martin Fuentes
Mirco Schultis
Stéphane Sarrazin
Tom Kimber-Smith
Sébastien Bourdais
Scott Mayer
Allan McNish
Ryan Dalziel
Enzo Potolicchio
Alex Popow
Brendon Hartley
Ryan Hunter-Reay
Rubens Barrichello
Marco Andretti

References

External links

Grand American Road Racing Association teams
American auto racing teams
FIA World Endurance Championship teams
24 Hours of Le Mans teams
WeatherTech SportsCar Championship teams
American Le Mans Series teams
Auto racing teams established in 2010